Máté Balla (born 12 January 1991) is a Hungarian rock musician, best known as the guitarist of the garage rock band Ivan & The Parazol.

Early life and personal life
Balla was born in Budapest, Hungary. In an interview with NullaHatEgy, Balla said that Ivan & The Parazol play Classic rock rather than Indie rock. He also pointed out that in Hungary the Hungarian indie bands were not persistent enough to reach international success.

On 10 June 2015, Balla was featured on D'Addario's website as a user of the strings.

Ivan & The Parazol

Balla is the founding member of Ivan & The Parazol.

Discography
With Ivan & The Parazol:
 Yellow Flavour (2012)
 Sellin' My Soul (2012)
 Mama Don't You Recognize Ivan & The Parazol? (2012)
 Mode Bizarre (2014)
 The All Right Nows (2015)

Instruments

Guitars
 Fender Stratocaster

Effect pedals
Boss DS-2
Electro-Harmonix Big Muff

Strings
D'Addario EXL 120
D'Addario EXL 115
D'Addario EJ 26

Amplifiers
Orange

See also
Budapest indie music scene
Ivan & The Parazol

References

External links
 Balla on Discogs

1991 births
Living people
Hungarian indie rock musicians